Portland Police Department may refer to:

Portland Police Department (Maine), Portland, Maine
Portland Police Bureau, Portland, Oregon